Pak Yung-sun (22 August 1956 – 14 July 1987), People's Athlete and Labor Hero, was an international table tennis player from North Korea. She represented the Korean People's Army's February 8 Sports Club.

Table tennis career
From 1974 to 1981 she won several medals in singles, doubles, and team events in the Asian Table Tennis Championships and in the World Table Tennis Championships.

The five World Championship medals included two gold medals in the singles at the 1975 World Table Tennis Championships and 1977 World Table Tennis Championships.

She is buried at the Patriotic Martyrs' Cemetery.

See also
 List of table tennis players
 List of World Table Tennis Championships medalists

References

Further reading
 

North Korean female table tennis players
1956 births
1987 deaths
Asian Games medalists in table tennis
Table tennis players at the 1974 Asian Games
Asian Games bronze medalists for North Korea
Medalists at the 1974 Asian Games
People from North Pyongan
People's Athletes
20th-century North Korean women